Julian Edward Gaillard (born August 13, 1970) is a former pitcher in Major League Baseball, playing for the Detroit Tigers and Tampa Bay Devil Rays between 1997 and 1999. He also played in the Japanese Central League, posting a total of 120 saves during his five-season stay. He is noted as one of the premier closers of the Chunichi Dragons.

Biography
Gaillard attended Forest Hill Community High School and Florida Southern College. In 1991, he played collegiate summer baseball with the Bourne Braves of the Cape Cod Baseball League. Gaillard was drafted by the Detroit Tigers in the 13th round of the 1993.

Gaillard joined the Chunichi Dragons in the Japanese Central League at the beginning of 2000. He took over the closing job that Korean pitcher Sun Dong-Yeol had left open after retiring, and led the league with 35 saves, appearing in the All-Star Game. However, he allowed the game-tying grand slam and walk-off home run back-to-back to the Yomiuri Giants, a first place team that was one win away from winning the league.

In April , he recorded his 100th save in only his 148th appearance, the fastest in the history of Japanese baseball. However, the Dragons began to use Akinori Otsuka as their closer, and he was put on waivers after complaining to the team about his lack of appearances. He also sustained an injury to his pitching arm, and returned to the U.S. in June, 2004 for surgery.

His final stats in Japan were a 2.90 ERA and 120 saves.

Pitching style
Gaillard's main weapon was his fastball, which fell in the mid 90 mph range during his prime. He threw a slider, splitter, and changeup to complement his fastball. He also had surprisingly good control, walking few batters in his appearances. He was one of the best closers in Japan in the early 2000s, ranking third among Chunichi Dragons players in saves, after Kaku Genji and Hitoki Iwase.

His name was originally written as ゲイラード, in Japan, but was changed to ギャラード, in order to match the English pronunciation.

References

External links

1970 births
Living people
Baseball players from Camden, New Jersey
Detroit Tigers players
Tampa Bay Devil Rays players
Chunichi Dragons players
Yokohama BayStars players
American expatriate baseball players in Japan
Major League Baseball pitchers
Lakeland Tigers players
Jacksonville Suns players
Toledo Mud Hens players
Durham Bulls players
Albuquerque Isotopes players
Florida Southern Moccasins baseball players
Forest Hill Community High School alumni
Bourne Braves players
Fayetteville Generals players
Gulf Coast Devil Rays players
Niagara Falls Rapids players
St. Petersburg Devil Rays players